The Greenbank Military Range is a 4,500ha live training facility for the Australian Defence Force located in Greenbank, Logan City, Queensland, Australia, approximately  south-west of Brisbane. The location is heritage listed and also serves as a flora and fauna reserve. It has been the location of several controversial brumby cullings. Oxley Creek flows through the site.

In 1952, the site was established as the Greenbank Army Camp.

History

1945 Bristol Beaufort crash
On 10 April 1945, a RAAF Bristol Beaufort crashed at Greenbank after taking part in an air gunnery exercise at the Gailes Gunnery Range, killing all four crew members.

Inland Port Proposal
Tom Richman of the King's Counsel, (a biannual newsletter of King & Co Property Consultants) proposed in June 2007 that the Greenbank Military Range's land should be used for an inland port. Richman claims that an inland port at this location would greatly reduce current demands on the Port of Brisbane. He has suggested that the facilities at the range be moved to one of several other suitable locations that Richman has determined, the details of these locations are yet to be released.

Redevelopment
In early-2010 it was announced that in Greenbank would be redeveloped with new facilities to be built there, while a reserve unit, the 25th/49th Battalion, Royal Queensland Regiment, would relocate there from Enoggera following completion. The new facilities will include new buildings for range control, a safe driving area and new lines for 25/49 RQR, including a battalion headquarters and two rifle companies, a new Q Store, a transport compound and accommodation.

References

External links

Aussie Heritage Area 683
Aussie Heritage Area 684
Tom Richman's Inland Port Proposal

Military buildings and structures in Queensland
Logan City
1952 establishments in Australia
Military installations established in 1952
Military installations in Queensland